RSS is an abbreviation for "Really Simple Syndication" or "Rich Site Summary", a family of web feed formats.

RSS may also refer to:

Organizations

Education
 Red Swastika School, Singapore
 Riverside Secondary School (Windsor, Ontario), Canada
 Rowan-Salisbury Schools, in Salisbury, North Carolina

Other organizations
Radio Security Service, a British signals intelligence group during World War II
Raqqa Is Being Slaughtered Silently, a citizen journalism effort in Syria
Rashtriya Swayamsevak Sangh, a Hindu nationalist volunteer organisation
Red Swastika Society, a Taoist association founded in China in 1922
Regional Security System, an agreement between several countries in the Eastern Caribbean region
Remote Sensing Systems, in Santa Rosa, California
IBM Retail Store Solutions, a division of IBM
Royal Society of Sculptors, a British organisation
Royal Stuart Society, a monarchist organisation in the United Kingdom

Mathematics
 Residual sum of squares in statistics
 Royal Statistical Society, a scientific and professional body for statisticians in the UK

Science and technology

Biology and medicine
 Russell-Silver syndrome, a form of dwarfism
 Recombination signal sequences, genes used to generate antibodies and T-cell receptors in immunology
 Reactive sulfur species, chemically reactive molecules containing sulfur

Computing and telecommunications
 Radio Service Software, a suite of programs sold by Motorola
 IBM Retail Store Solutions, a division of IBM
 Received signal strength indication, referring to the strength of the signal that a receiver gets in a wireless communication
 Receive-side scaling, a scaling technique for network traffic processing
 Resident set size, the portion of memory occupied by a process that is held in RAM

Other uses
 Radio science subsystem, on a scientific spacecraft, the use of radio signals to probe a medium such as a planetary atmosphere
 Reduced Space Symbology, a family of barcodes now called GS1 DataBar
 Rotary steerable system, a tool used in the drilling industry
 Rotating Service Structure, part of the Space Shuttle launch tower

Other uses
 Red Sea (state) in Sudan
 Regional spatial strategy, a planning document for a region of England
 Republic of Singapore Ship, commissioned Navy ships belonging to the Republic of Singapore Navy
 Reusable spaceship
 Rockdale, Sandow and Southern Railroad, in Texas

See also

 
 
 RS (disambiguation)
 RS2 (disambiguation)